William Choice Jr. (9 June 1880 – 6 February 1942) was a college football player. He served in the Spanish–American War.

College football

VPI
In 1899 he was a prominent guard for Virginia Polytechnic Institute, and selected for the All-Southern all-star team.

University of Virginia
In 1900 he played for Southern champions, Virginia Cavaliers, and was again selected for All-Southern.

References

External links
 

Virginia Cavaliers football players
Virginia Tech Hokies football players
American football guards
All-Southern college football players
19th-century players of American football
Sportspeople from Spartanburg, South Carolina
1880 births
1942 deaths
Players of American football from South Carolina